HMS Pitcairn (K589) was a  of the United Kingdom that served during World War II. She originally was ordered by the United States Navy as the Tacoma-class patrol frigate USS Pilford (PF-85) and was transferred to the Royal Navy prior to completion.

Construction and acquisition
The ship, originally designated a "patrol gunboat," PG-193, was ordered by the United States Maritime Commission under a U.S. Navy contract as USS Pilford. She was reclassified as a "patrol frigate," PF-85, on 15 April 1943 and laid down by the Walsh-Kaiser Company at Providence, Rhode Island, on 14 September 1943. Intended for transfer to the United Kingdom, the ship was renamed Pitcairn by the British prior to launching and was launched on 15 October 1943.

Service history
Transferred to the United Kingdom under Lend-Lease on 6 July 1944, the ship was commissioned by the Royal Navy on 7 July 1944 as HMS Pitcairn (K589). She served on patrol and escort duty.

Disposal
The United Kingdom returned Pitcairn to the U.S. Navy on 11 June 1946. She was stricken from the U.S. Naval Vessel Register on 3 July 1946 and transferred for disposal to the U.S. Maritime Commission, which sold her to the John J. Duane Company of Quincy, Massachusetts, on 5 November 1947 for scrapping.

References

Notes

Bibliography

 Navsource Online: Frigate Photo Archive HMS Pitcairn (K 589) ex-Pilford ex-PF-85 ex-PG-193

External links
 Photo gallery of USS Pilford and HMS Pitcairn

1943 ships
Ships built in Providence, Rhode Island
Tacoma-class frigates
Colony-class frigates
World War II frigates and destroyer escorts of the United States
World War II frigates of the United Kingdom